The PowerBook 100 is a portable subnotebook personal computer designed and manufactured by Sony for Apple Computer and introduced on October 21, 1991, at the COMDEX computer expo in Las Vegas, Nevada. Priced at US$2,500 with external floppy drive, the PowerBook 100 was the low-end model of the first three simultaneously released PowerBooks. Its CPU and overall speed closely resembled those of its predecessor, the Macintosh Portable. It had a Motorola 68000 processor at 16 MHz, 2-8 megabytes (MB) of RAM, a  monochrome backlit liquid crystal display (LCD) with 640 × 400 pixel resolution, and the System 7.0.1 operating system. It did not have a built-in floppy disk drive and was noted for its unique compact design that placed a trackball pointing device in front of the keyboard for ease of use.

Apple's then-chief executive officer (CEO) John Sculley started the PowerBook project in 1990, allocating $1 million for marketing. Despite the small marketing budget, the new PowerBook line was a success, generating over $1 billion in revenue for Apple in its first year. Sony designed and manufactured the PowerBook 100 in collaboration with the Apple Industrial Design Group, Apple's internal design team. It was discontinued on September 3, 1992, and superseded by the PowerBook 145 and PowerBook Duo series. Since then, it has been praised several times for its design; PC World named the PowerBook 100 the tenth-greatest PC of all time in 2006, and US magazine Mobile PC chose the PowerBook 100 as the greatest gadget of all time in 2005.

History
From 1990, John Sculley, then CEO of Apple, oversaw product development personally to ensure that Apple released new computers to market more quickly. His new strategy was to increase market share by lowering prices and releasing more "hit" products. This strategy contributed to the commercial success of the low-end Macintosh Classic and Macintosh LC, desktop computers released by Apple in 1990. Sculley wanted to replicate the success of these products with Apple's new PowerBook line.

Sculley began the project in 1990 and wanted the PowerBook to be released within one year. The project had three managers: John Medica, who managed engineering for the new laptop; Randy Battat, who was the vice president for product marketing; and Neil Selvin, who headed the marketing effort. Medica, Battat, and Selvin deliberately designed the PowerBook to weigh less than its competitors.

Sculley allocated a $1 million marketing budget to the PowerBook product line, in contrast to the $25 million used to market the Macintosh Classic. Medica, Battat, and Selvin used most of the money to produce and air a television commercial that viewers would remember. Advertising agency Chiat/Day filmed retired Los Angeles Lakers basketball star Kareem Abdul-Jabbar sitting uncomfortably in a small airline coach seat yet typing comfortably on his PowerBook. The ad caption read: "At least his hands are comfortable."

Apple unveiled the PowerBook 100 on October 21, 1991, at the Comdex computer expo in Las Vegas, alongside two other models: the PowerBook 140 and PowerBook 170. Both the advertisement and the product were successful. Apple projected US sales of more than 200,000 PowerBooks in the first year, with peak demand in the first three months of release. By January 1992, Apple had sold more than 100,000 PowerBooks, by which time they were in short supply. Apple soon solved the supply problems, and the proceeds from PowerBook sales reached $1 billion in the first year after launch. Apple surpassed Toshiba and Compaq as the market leader in worldwide share of portable computer shipments. The PowerBook 100, 140, and 170 contributed greatly to Apple's financial success in 1992. At the end of the financial year, Apple announced its highest figures yet, $7.1 billion in revenues and an increase in global market share from 8% to 8.5%, the highest it had been in four years.

However, the initial popularity of the PowerBook 100 did not last. Sales decreased, and by December 1991 the 140 and 170 models had become more popular because customers were willing to pay more for a built-in floppy disk drive and second serial port, which the PowerBook 100 lacked. In early 1992, the PowerBook 100 was offered at $2,300 without the external floppy drive. By August 10, 1992, Apple quietly dropped the PowerBook 100 from its price list but continued to sell existing stock through its own dealers and alternative discount consumer-oriented stores such as Price Club. In these stores, a 4 MB RAM/40 MB hard drive configuration with a floppy drive sold for less than $1,000 (more than $1,500 less than the similar 2 MB/20 MB configuration's original list price).

On September 17, 1992, Apple recalled 60,000 PowerBook 100s because of a potential safety problem. An electrical short, it was discovered, could melt a small hole in the casing, which occurred in three of the 60,000 notebooks manufactured between October 1991 and March 1992. On the day of the recall, Apple shares closed at $47, down $1.25, but some analysts discounted the recall's importance. In addition, the original power supplies had problems with insulation cracks that could cause a short in a fuse on the motherboard; and the computer was prone to cracks in the power adapter socket on the motherboard, which required a $400 replacement motherboard if the warranty had expired.

Features
Most of the PowerBook 100's internal components were based on its predecessor, the Macintosh Portable. It included a Motorola 68HC000 16 MHz processor, had 2 MB memory, no floppy disk drive, and cost approximately $2,500 with external floppy drive. Later the PowerBook 100 was offered without the external floppy drive for $2,300. The dimensions of the PowerBook 100 were an improvement over the Portable. Another significant difference was the less expensive passive matrix display used instead of the sharper active matrix used on the Portable (and the 170). The PowerBook 100 included the System 7.0.1 operating system as standard, with support for all versions up to System 7.5.5. Apple, however, released System 6.0.8L, which allowed the PowerBook 100 to run System 6. It could also be used with some earlier System 6 versions, although Apple did not officially support this.

The PowerBook 100 had one external serial port, designed for use with a printer or any compatible RS-422 device. It was the first Macintosh to omit an external modem port, instead offering an optional built-in 2400 baud modem for communications. As a result, for the first time a user could not print directly and access AppleTalk or a faster external modem simultaneously, and devices such as advanced MIDI interfaces could not be used because they required the dedicated use of both ports. A third-party serial modem port could, however, be installed in the internal modem slot for consumers who needed traditional functions.

When the computer was not in use, contents of the memory were preserved as long as the main lead-acid battery remained charged. The PowerBook 100 Power Manager was an integrated circuit, usually placed on the logic board of a PowerBook, and was responsible for the power management of the computer. Identical to that of the Macintosh Portable, it controlled the display's backlight, hard drive spin-down, sleep and wake, battery charging, trackball control, and input/output (I/O). The 100 did add a new feature: 3.5 V batteries backed up permanent and expansion random access memory (RAM) when the PowerBook 100's battery was being replaced or when the 100 was otherwise temporarily removed from all power sources. This made it a perfect candidate for use with Apple's RAM disk to help increase battery life by accessing the hard disk less frequently, since the 100 was the only PowerBook that maintained the contents of RAM on shutdown in order to reduce startup time.

The PowerBook 100 was the first PowerBook to incorporate SCSI Disk Mode, which allowed it to be used as an external hard disk on a desktop Macintosh. This provided a convenient method for software to be installed onto the PowerBook or transferred to the desktop, without the need for the 100's optional floppy disk drive. A specialized SCSI cable with a unique connector was required, however, to use any SCSI device on the PowerBook series. A second dedicated cable was required for SCSI Disk Mode. This feature was unique to the 100 until Apple introduced new PowerBooks more than a year later.

There are two versions of the PowerBook 100's QWERTY layout keyboard: a domestic US version with 63 keys and an international ISO version with 64 keys. The caps lock key on the PowerBook 100 did not have a locking position or a lighted indicator of its status, and to compensate, the System 7 operating system software includes an extension file that causes an icon of the international caps lock symbol (⇪) to appear in the upper right-hand corner of the menu bar when Caps Lock is active.

The internals of the PowerBook 100 were the basis of the Apple Wizzy Active Lifestyle Telephone prototype.

Design
Both the PowerBook 140 and 170 were designed before the 100 by the Apple Industrial Design Group, from March 1990-February 1991. The 100's styling was based on those computers and represents the first improvements to the PowerBook line as Apple benefited from the lessons learned in developing the more powerful models' enclosure. The 100 was designed between September and December 1990, and retained the same design elements, which were a variation on the Snow White design language Apple had been using since 1984.

Apple approached Sony in late 1989 because it did not have enough engineers to handle the number of new products that were planned for delivery in 1991. Using a basic blueprint from Apple, including a list of chips and other components, and the Portable's architecture, the 100 was miniaturized and manufactured by Sony in San Diego, California, and Japan. Sony engineers had little experience building personal computers but nonetheless completed Apple's smallest and lightest machine in under 13 months, cancelling other projects and giving the PowerBook 100 top priority. Sony president Norio Ohga gave project manager Kihey Yamamoto permission to recruit engineers from any Sony division.

Robert Brunner, Apple's head of industrial design at the time, led the design team that developed the laptop, including its trackball and granite color. Brunner said he designed the PowerBook "so it would be as easy to use and carry as a regular book". The dark granite grey color set it apart from other notebook computers of the time and also from Apple's other products, which traditionally were beige or platinum grey. The trackball, another new design element, was placed in the middle of the computer, allowing the PowerBook to be easily operated by both left- and right-handed users. The designers were trying to create a fashion statement with the overall design of the laptop, which they felt made it a more personal accessory, like a wallet or briefcase. Brunner said: "It says something about the identity of the person who is carrying it".

Reception
Crystal Waters of Home Office Computing praised the PowerBook 100's "unique, effective design" but was disappointed because the internal modem did not receive faxes, and the 100 had no monitor port. The low-capacity 20 MB hard drive was also criticized. Once a user's core applications had been installed, little room was left for optional programs and documents. Waters concluded: "Having used the 100 constantly in the past few weeks, I know I wouldn't feel cheated by buying it - if only it had a 40MB hard-disk drive option."

PC Week benchmarked the PowerBook 100, measuring it against its predecessor, the Macintosh Portable. The PowerBook 100 took 5.3 seconds to open a Microsoft Word document and 2.5 seconds to save it, while the Portable took 5.4 and 2.6 seconds respectively. PC Week tested the battery life, which delivered 3 hours 47 minutes of use. Byte magazines review concluded, "The PowerBook 100 is recommended for word processing and communications tasks; the higher-end products offer enough power for complex reports, large spreadsheets and professional graphics." MacWEEK described it as "ideal for writers and others on a tight budget."

The PowerBook 100 continues to receive recognition from the press. PC World named the PowerBook 100 the 10th-greatest PC of all time in 2006, and in 2005, US magazine Mobile PC chose the PowerBook 100 as the greatest gadget of all time, ahead of the Sony Walkman and Atari 2600. The PowerBook 100 received multiple awards for its design, including the 1999 IDSA Silver Design of the Decade Award, Form magazine's 1993 Designer's Design Awards, the 1992 ISDA Gold Industrial Design Excellence Award, the 1992 Appliance Manufacturer Excellence in Design award, and the Industry Forum Design 10 Best - Hannover Fair award.

Specifications

Timeline

See also
Macintosh Portable
List of Macintosh models grouped by CPU type

References

External links
Vintage and obsolete products from Apple.com
PowerBook 100 on Low End Mac
PowerBook 100 Specs on Everymac.com
PowerBook 100 on Apple-History.com

100
68k Macintosh computers
Computer-related introductions in 1991